Jukka Pellervo Tyrkkö (2 April 1912, in Ylöjärvi – 16 October 1979) was a Finnish war writer.

Life

In 1933, at the age of just 21, Jukka Tyrkkö began publishing the first newspaper in Ylöjärvi, entitled Ylöjärvi (now Ylöjärven uutiset). Tyrkkö served in the Finnish Volunteer Battalion of the Waffen-SS as a war correspondent. He later recounted these experiences in his book Suomalaisia suursodassa (English: Finns in the Great War). From 1943 to 1944 he was also the secretary of the Finnish SS-Aseveljet (the SS Brothers in Arms Association).

Works

 Myllärin tytär (My daughter's daughter) (play, 1949)
 Suomalaisia suursodassa. SS-vapaaehtoisten vaiheita jääkäreiden jäljillä 1941–43 (Finns in the Great War) (1960)
 Kultakello (English: Gold watches) (novel, 1970)
 Sallan savotta 1941 (1971)
 Pajari rintamakenraalina: Aaro Olavi Pajari (1897–1949) sotilaana, esimiehenä ja ihmisenä (English: Pajari as Front Colonel: Aaro Olavi Pajari (1897-1949) as a Soldier, Head and Man )(1974)
 Lauri Törnin tarina: vapaustaistelijan vaiheita Viipurista Vietnamiin (English: The story of Lauri Törn: Liberty fighters from Vyborg to Vietnam) (1975)

References

1912 births
1979 deaths
War correspondents of World War II
Finnish dramatists and playwrights
Male journalists
Finnish male novelists
Male dramatists and playwrights
20th-century Finnish novelists
20th-century dramatists and playwrights
People from Ylöjärvi
20th-century male writers
20th-century Finnish journalists
Finnish Waffen-SS personnel